St. Louis Stars is a sports club that was formed in 1969 and is a founding member of the Saint-Martin Senior League which was established in 1970. St. Louis are the most successful club in the Saint-Martin Championships with 20 league titles. However, in the past 13 years they have only managed to claim the title once, which was in the 2008/09 season.

ASC St. Louis Stars takes part a variety of sports such as basketball and volleyball, however football is the club's main sport.

The club qualified for the 2018 CFU Club Championship, having finished in the top two of the 2016–17 Saint-Martin Senior League.

Honours 
 Saint-Martin Championships
 Champions (20): 1973–74, 1974–75, 1975–76, 1976–77, 1977–78, 1978–1979, 1981–82, 1982–83 1983–84, 1984–85, 1986–87, 1987–88, 1988–89, 1991–92, 1992–93, 1993/94, 1994–95, 1995–96, 2000–01, 2008–09

References
RSSSF

Saint-Martin Football Association

Football clubs in Saint Martin